The 1942 Kentucky Derby was the 68th running of the Kentucky Derby. The race took place on May 2, 1942.

Full results

 Winning breeder: Greentree Stable (KY)

References

1942
Kentucky Derby
Derby
May 1942 sports events